Karl Turner may refer to:
Karl Turner (American politician) (born 1942), American politician and businessman from Maine
Karl Turner (British politician) (born 1971), British Labour Member of Parliament
Karl Turner (cricketer) (born 1987), English cricketer

See also
Carl Turner (disambiguation)